St. John Central Academy is a private christian school in Bellaire, Ohio.  Their nickname is the Fighting Irish, and their athletic teams compete as members of the Ohio Valley Athletic Conference.

From 1857 to 2019, a St. John Central High School operated as part of the Roman Catholic Diocese of Steubenville. The diocese announced on February 5, 2019 that the school would close in June 2019. However, a private committee established St. John Central Academy in the same building, opening the fall after the former school closed. The new academy inherited the history of St. John Central, including its athletic teams, but is considered a new entity with no affiliation to the diocese.

Athletics

The school competes in the Ohio Valley Athletic Conference of the Ohio High School Athletic Association.

OHSAA state championships
 Girls Track and Field - 2007*, 2008 
 Boys Cross Country - 2008
 *tied with Gilmour Academy.

Cross Country
The St. John men's Cross Country team had won seven consecutive OVAC class A/AA titles (2003 to 2009) under the guidance of head coach Jeremy Midei. During that period they have won the over-all OVAC title six times (2007: 2nd to eventual WV Large School State Champions Wheeling Park). The team has also won the past four OHSAA division III eastern district titles, and OHSAA division III Central Regional titles, as well as capturing the 2008 OHSAA division III state title.

References

External links

Catholic secondary schools in Ohio
High schools in Belmont County, Ohio
Educational institutions established in 1857
Educational institutions disestablished in 2019
1857 establishments in Ohio
2019 disestablishments in Ohio
2019 establishments in Ohio
Defunct Catholic secondary schools in Ohio